Sean Moore (born 13 August 2005) is a Northern Irish footballer who plays for Cliftonville, as a winger and full back.

Club career
Moore began his career with Cliftonville, being linked with a move away from the club in January 2023. On 25 February 2023, Moore scored both goals in a 2-1 league victory over Glentoran.

International career
Moore has represented Northern Ireland at under-18 level.

References

2005 births
Living people
Association footballers from Northern Ireland
Northern Ireland youth international footballers
Cliftonville F.C. players
Association football fullbacks
Association football wingers
NIFL Premiership players